Mauricio Juan Rosa Noni (born April 4, 1986 in Paso de los Toros) is a Uruguayan footballer currently playing for Central Español.

Teams
  River Plate de Montevideo 2007-2008
  Rampla Juniors 2008-2009
  Rentistas 2010
  Deportes Antofagasta 2011–2012
  Unión Temuco 2012
  Central Español 2013–present

Titles
  Deportes Antofagasta 2011 (Torneo Apertura Primera B Championship)

References
 Profile at BDFA 
 Profile at Tenfield Digital 

1986 births
Living people
People from Paso de los Toros
Uruguayan footballers
Uruguayan expatriate footballers
Club Atlético River Plate (Montevideo) players
Rampla Juniors players
C.A. Rentistas players
Central Español players
C.D. Antofagasta footballers
Unión Temuco footballers
Primera B de Chile players
Expatriate footballers in Chile

Association football midfielders